The Kalamazoo Jr. K-Wings were an American Tier II junior ice hockey team based in Kalamazoo, Michigan. The Kalamazoo Jr. K-Wings began its inaugural season in 2011. The K-Wings played their home games at Wings West Arena, (formerly known as S2 Ice Arena) which seats 1,500. On November 4, 2010 the North American Hockey League approved of the K-Wings affiliation with the ECHL's Kalamazoo Wings. This team was a different franchise than the previous Kalamazoo Jr. Wings team that eventually became the Danville Wings and eventually the Indiana Ice of the United States Hockey League.

On February 4, 2013, the K-Wings announced that the organization would cease operations after the completion of the 2012–13 NAHL season. Kalamazoo was dead last in attendance averaging around 350 per game.

Season-by-season records

External links
Official website of the Kalamazoo Jr. K-Wings
Official website of the NAHL
Official website of Wings West Arena

References

Defunct North American Hockey League teams
Sports in Kalamazoo, Michigan
Ice hockey teams in Michigan
Ice hockey clubs established in 2011
Ice hockey clubs disestablished in 2013